The flag of Uzbekistan consists of a horizontal triband of azure, white and green, separated by two thin red fimbriations, with a white crescent moon and twelve white stars at the canton.  Adopted in 1991 to replace the flag of the Uzbek Soviet Socialist Republic (SSR), it has been the flag of the Republic of Uzbekistan since the country gained independence in that same year. The design of the present flag was partly inspired by the former one.

Design

Symbolism 

The azure colour on the flag is a symbol of blue sky and clear water. Azure is also the colour of the Turkic peoples. White is the traditional Uzbek symbol of peace and good luck. Green is a symbol of nature, new life, and good harvest. The red fimbriation represent the power of life.

The image of the crescent moon is connected with Uzbek historical image (a symbol of the Uzbek traditional religion, Islam) as well as being a symbol of the birth of a new nation. The stars represent spirituality and divinity, as well as an allusion to Uzbek historical tradition and calendar, the 12 stars on the flag are arranged in such a way that visually they form the inscription Allah in Arabic script. The stars are also a symbol of the pursuit of perfection and happiness of Uzbek people in their homeland.

Legal protection 
On 27 December 2010, President Islam Karimov signed an amendment to the law that strengthened the protection of the country's symbols, including its flag and emblem.  It banned the utilization of the flag of Uzbekistan for promotional and commercial purposes, including its usage in advertisements and documents.  It also forbade any organizations that are not affiliated with the Uzbek government from adopting logos that resemble the national symbols.

Construction sheet

History 

Under Soviet rule, the Union Republic – situated in what is now modern-day Uzbekistan – utilised a flag derived from the flag of the Soviet Union and representing Communism, that was approved in 1952.  The flag is similar to the Soviet design but with the blue stripe in 1/5 width and the two 1/100 white edges in between.

Uzbekistan declared itself independent on 1 September 1991, approximately three months before the dissolution of the Soviet Union.  A search for a national flag began soon after, with a contest being held to determine the new design.  More than 200 submissions were made, and a commission was formed in order to evaluate these suggestions coming from a variety of stakeholders.  The winning design was adopted on 18 November 1991, after being selected at an extraordinary session of the Uzbek Supreme Soviet.  In doing so, Uzbekistan became the first of the newly independent republics in Central Asia to choose a new flag. Pertaining to its tricolour combination of horizontal stripes of blue, white and green colour, it is similar to the flags of Lesotho, an enclaved country within the border of South Africa, and Puntland, a Somali federal state at the tip of the Horn.

Other flags

References

External links 

 
 Uzbekistan – Vexillographia

Uzbekistan
Flag
 
Flags with star and crescent
Flags introduced in 1991